Jonathan Steuer (born December 3, 1965, in Wisconsin) is a pioneer in online publishing.

Steuer led the launch teams of a number of early and influential online publishing ventures, including Cyborganic, a pioneering online/offline community, HotWired, the first ad-supported web magazine, and c|net's online operations. Steuer's article "Defining virtual realities: Dimensions determining telepresence", is widely cited in academic and industry literature. Originally published in 1992 in the Journal of Communication 42, 73-9, it has been reprinted in Communication in the Age of Virtual Reality (1995), F. Biocca & M. R. Levy (Eds.).

Steuer's vividness and interactivity matrix from that article appeared in Wired circa 1995 and has been particularly influential in shaping the discourse by defining virtual reality in terms of human experience, rather than technological hardware, and setting out vividness and interactivity as axial dimensions of that experience. Steuer's notability in diverse arenas as a scholar, architect, and instigator of new media is documented in multiple, independent, non-trivial, published works.

Steuer has been a consultant and senior executive for a number of other online media startups: CNet, ZDTV, Sawyer Media Systems and Scient.

Steuer has an AB in philosophy from Harvard University, and a PhD in communication theory & research from Stanford University. There, his doctoral dissertation concerned Vividness and Source of Evaluation as Determinants of Social Responses Toward Mediated Representations of Agency.

Personal Life

He is married to Majorie Ingall. A longtime resident of the Bay Area, today Steuer resides in New York City.

References

Further reading
Some books and print articles that discuss Steuer's role in the web publishing industry that emerged in San Francisco in the 1990s:
Yoshihiro Kaneda, Net Voice in the City, ASCII Corporation, Japan, 1997, pp. 88–107
Robert H. Reid, Architects of the Web, John Wiley & Sons, New York, 1997, pp. 289–292, 296-297, 299-300, 302-303.
Jeff Goodell, "Webheads on Ramona Street", Rolling Stone, Issue 722, November 30, 1995.

Some books and print that draw on Steuer's definitions of virtual reality and telepresence:
Mike Featherstone and Roger Burrows (Eds.), Cyberspace/Cyberbodies/Cyberpunk, Sage Publications, London, 1995.
Nicovich, S. G., Boller, G. W., and Cornwell, T. B. "Experienced presence within computer-mediated communications: Initial explorations on the effects of gender with respect to empathy and immersion", Journal of Computer-Mediated Communication, 10(2), article 6, (2005).
Kuo-Fang Peng, Yi-Wen Fan, Tong-An Hsu,"Proposing the content perception theory for the online content industry – a structural equation modeling", Industrial Management & Data Systems Volume 104 Number 6 2004 pp. 469–489 (2004).
Coyle, James R. ; Thorson, Esther, "The Effects of Progressive Levels of Interactivity and Vividness in Web Marketing Sites", Journal of Advertising, 22 September 2001.
Donna L. Hoffman; Thomas P. Novak, "Marketing in Hypermedia Computer-Mediated Environments: Conceptual Foundations", Journal of Marketing, 1996.
Larry R. Irons, Donald J. Jung, and Robert O. Keel, "Interactivity in Distance Learning: The Digital Divide and Student Satisfaction",  Educational Technology & Society 5 (3) 2002.

Besides the printed works above, Steuer's article is cited in many online works, a few of which are listed here:
EDUCAUSE REVIEW | January/February 2007, Volume 42, Number 1
A Definition
ICA Info Systems: Coyle & Ognianova
Social Impacts of Rich Media
A Psychological Approach to Presence

Online publishing
1965 births
Harvard University alumni
Stanford University alumni
Living people